Kira Michaela Brunton (born March 17, 1999) is a Canadian curler originally from Sudbury, Ontario. She currently plays third on Team Danielle Inglis. In 2015, she won the gold medal at the 2015 Canada Winter Games playing third for Megan Smith.

Career
Brunton made her first national appearance at the 2015 Canada Winter Games where she played third for Megan Smith. After a 6–0 round robin record, they defeated Saskatchewan in the semifinal and Nova Scotia in the final to claim the gold medal. The following season, she qualified for both the 2016 U18 International Curling Championships and the 2016 Canadian Junior Curling Championships where she missed the playoffs at both events. She was more successful at the 2017 Canadian U18 Curling Championships where she led her team of Kate Sherry, Sydnie Stinson and Jessica Leonard to the final where they defeated New Brunswick to claim the title. After not qualifying for any national events during the 2017–18 season, Brunton played in the 2019 Canadian Junior Curling Championships, 2019 U Sports/Curling Canada University Curling Championships and 2019 Canadian Mixed Doubles Curling Championship during the 2018–19 season where she finished 5–5 at the juniors, won the University championships representing Laurentian University and finished 1–6 at the mixed doubles nationals. Also during the 2018–19 season, her team won the Stu Sells Toronto Tankard World Curling Tour event and played in the 2018 Tour Challenge where they lost in a tiebreaker. Brunton won her third provincial junior title the following year and finished with a 5–4 record at the 2020 Canadian Junior Curling Championships. She was also able to defend her title at the Stu Sells Toronto Tankard, defeating Cathy Auld in the final.

In 2020, Brunton moved to Ottawa, and graduated to women's play, joining the Lauren Mann rink for the 2020–21 season with Cheryl Kreviazuk and Karen Trines at second and lead respectively. The team found immediate success in their first tour event, surprising a short-handed Team Jennifer Jones in the final of the 2020 Stu Sells Toronto Tankard, Brunton's third time winning the event. Brunton competed at the 2021 Scotties Tournament of Hearts, her first Canadian women's curling championship, as alternate for Krysta Burns Northern Ontario rink. At the Hearts, they finished with a 2–6 round robin record, defeating Northwest Territories' Kerry Galusha and Yukon's Laura Eby. Brunton got to play in the team's final game of the tournament, replacing Amanda Gates at lead.

Personal life
Brunton previously attended Laurentian University for sports psychology, and is now a Masters student in counselling psychology at Yorkville University.

Teams

References

External links

1999 births
Canadian women curlers
Living people
Sportspeople from Greater Sudbury
Laurentian University alumni
Curlers from Ottawa